Metropolitan Zacharias Mor Philoxinos, (Malayalam: അഭിവന്ദ്യ മോര്‍ പീലക്സീനോസ് സക്കറിയാസ് മെത്രാപ്പോലീത്ത), is a  Metropolitan of the Malankara Syrian Jacobite Church.

Early years

Therambil Achan was born in Kumarakom, Kottayam, Kerala in 1972. He was brought up in the Syriac Orthodox faith since his childhood. He passed his SSLC exams with first class and joined St. Mary's College Manarcad Kottayam for Pre Degree Course,  Philoxinos was the chief Patron of Marian Alumni The Old Students Association of St. Mary's College Manarcad, Baselious College, Kottayam where he did his B.A. in English literature. Alongside his secular education, he also pursued his Sunday School education. He stood first in the 10th standard examinations.

Family
His parents were Late Ittyavira & Sosamma Ittyavira. He has two brothers. Kuriakose TI&Kurian TI.

Ordination

Mor Philoxenos was ordained a deacon in 1998 by Geevarghese Mor Gregorios (Perumpally Thirumeni) and a priest in 2000 by Thomas Mor Themotheose Metropolitan. After his ordination, he served various parishes in Kottayam Diocese. As well as he is the spiritual leader of all spiritual organisations of the Jacobite Church in Kottayam Diocese.

Ministries run by Mor Philoxenos Zacharias
(Mor Gregorian centers in Thoothootty & Wayanad):

 Mor Gregorian Retreat Centre
 Mor Gregorian Counselling Centre
 Mor Gregorian Sharing Ministry (The Registered Charitable Society)
 Mor Gregorian Homes - The Centre for the elderly people
 Mor Gregorian Prayer Group
 Mor Gregorian Pain and Palliative Care Society
 Mor Gregorian Pain and Palliative Clinic
 Mor Gregorian free Ambulance Service

References

See also
Syriac Orthodox Church
Jacobite Syrian Christian Church

1972 births
Living people
Syriac Orthodox Church bishops
Indian Oriental Orthodox Christians
Christian clergy from Kottayam